The Pennsylvania Sports Hall of Fame (PSHF) is a nonprofit organization established in 1962. It is the only community-based hall of fame in the United States. At its annual convention and induction ceremonial, the PSHF inducts athletes, coaches, administrators, and those involved in sports medicine and the sports media, whose athletic achievements "have brought lasting fame and recognition to the State of Pennsylvania". At the induction ceremony, ten living and two deceased inductees are honored, with the presentation of a Gold Inductee medallion with pendant. The convention and ceremonial are rotated among the chapters of the Central, Eastern, Northern, and Western regions.

The first induction ceremony was in 1963.

The first Ceremonial Dinner was held in 1963, in Philadelphia; the second was in 1964, at the Pittsburgh William Penn Hotel.

The Western Region hosted the 50th Anniversary Dinner on November 11, 2012, at the Sheraton Four Points in Warrendale.

Regional chapters
The PSHF has twenty-eight chartered chapters, which serve over 300 communities in the state. The chapters are divided into four regions: Central, Eastern, Northern, and Western.

The Central Region's nine chapters are: Berks County, Capital, Central, Clinton County, Huntingdon, South Central, Susquehanna Valley, West Branch, and West Shore.

The Eastern Region's six chapters are: Bucks County, City All Star (Philadelphia), Delaware County, Montgomery County, Summit, and Tri-County.

The Northern Region's seven chapters are: Allen Rogowicz, Bernie Romanoski, Carbon County, Ed Romance, Luzerne-John Popple, Northeastern, and Northern Anthracite.

The Western Region's six chapters are: East Boros, Erie County, Fayette County, Mid Mon Valley, Washington-Greene County, and Western.

Nominations
Each year, each chapter may nominate the names of no more than three living persons and two deceased persons, for consideration as possible inductees.

Induction ceremonies
The 2016 induction ceremony will be hosted by the Erie County Chapter on Saturday, October 22, 2016, at the Erie Bayfront Convention Center.

Inductees
See footnote

Baseball
See footnote

1963: John Lobert
1963: Connie Mack
1963: Stan Musial
1963: Jim Thorpe
1963: Harold "Pie" Traynor
1965: Roy Campanella
1965: Jimmy Dykes
1965: Jimmy Foxx
1965: Robert (Lefty) Grove
1965: Christy Mathewson
1966: Lester Bell
1966: Charles Gelbert
1966: Robin Roberts
1967: Charles Kelchner
1968: George (Whitey) Kurowski
1968: Bill McKechnie
1968: Curt Simmons
1968: Lloyd Waner
1969: Robert Friend
1969: Dick Groat
1970: Elroy Face
1970: Ralph Kiner
1970: Josh Gibson
1971: Stanley Coveleskie
1971: William Cox
1971: Nellie Fox
1971: Herb Pennock
1971: William Walters
1971: Lewis Wilson
1972: Richie Ashburn
1972: Frank Gustine
1972: Eddie Plank
1972: Ken Raffensberger
1973: Roberto Clemente
1973: Bing Miller
1973: John Ogden
1973: Truett (Rip) Sewell
1975: Eddie Collins, Sr.
1975: Del Ennis
1975: William Myers
1975: Cum Posey
1975: Tommy Richardson
1976: Frederick Frankhouse
1976: Charles "Chick" Fullis
1976: Carl Furillo
1977: Theodore Page
1977: James T. Sheckard
1977: William H. Sherdel
1977: Vic Wertz
1978: Danny Murtaugh
1978: Bobby Shantz
1978: Pete Suder
1978: James (Mickey) Vernon
1979: Joe Boley
1979: Gerald Lynch
1979: Sam McDowell
1979: Robert Purkey
1979: Charles T (Broadway) Wagner
1980: George Earnshaw
1980: Dick Gernert
1980: Don R. Wert
1981: Howard Bedell
1981: Randall Gumpert
1981: Ralph B. Melix
1981: George W. Staller
1982: James B, DeShong
1983: Joseph Holden
1983: Dave Ricketts
1983: Jimmy Ripple
1984: James Clarkson
1984: Thomas Ferrick
1984: Elmer Valo
1985: Billy Hunter
1985: Bill Mazeroski
1986: John P. Quinn
1986: Eddie Sawyer
1987: Al Brancato
1988: Stan Lopata
1988: Art Mahaffey
1989: Albert (Sparky) Lyle
1990: Earl (Sparky) Adams
1990: Steve Blass
1991: Eugene Benson
1992: Gene Garber
1992: John E Murphy
1992: Al (Scoop) Oliver
1993: Stephen F. O'Neil
1993: Chuck Tanner
1994: Nelson (Nellie) Briles
1995: Robert A. McDonnell
1996: Richard (Dick) Allen
1996: Nathan (Ed) Ott
1996: Manuel (Manny) Sanguillén
1997: Thomas M. Herr
1997: Richard Tracewski
2000: Hugh Jennings
2000: Kent Tekulve
2000: Bill Virdon
2002: Jean Marlowe
2002: Tom O'Malley
2002: Ed Walsh
2002: Bob Williams
2003: Steve Bilko
2003: Lee Elia
2003: Joseph Page
2003: Robert Walk
2004: George (Ken) Griffey, Sr.
2004: Mark Gubicza
2005: Greg Gross
2005: Stanley (Bucky) Harris
2006: Jim W. Russell
2007: Joe Glenn
2008: Walter Harris
2008: Pete Vukovich
2012: Nellie King
2012: Jeff Manto
2012: Jim Leyland
2014: Harry Kalas
2014: Ron Necciai
2014: Lance Rautzhan

Football
?

See footnote

See also
Philadelphia Sports Hall of Fame
Sports in Pennsylvania

References

External links
 

>
All-sports halls of fame
State sports halls of fame in the United States
Halls of fame in Pennsylvania
Non-profit organizations based in Pennsylvania
501(c)(3) organizations
Awards established in 1963
Sports organizations established in 1962
1962 establishments in Pennsylvania